Ober-Ramstadt is a railway station in Ober-Ramstadt, Hesse, Germany.

The station
The station is located on the Odenwald railway (Darmstadt – Wiebelsbach) and is served by RB services operated by VIAS.

Train services
The following services currently call at Ober-Ramstadt:

Bus services
 K 56

References

Railway stations in Hesse
Railway stations in Germany opened in 1870
Buildings and structures in Darmstadt-Dieburg